The 1911 Cork Senior Hurling Championship was the 24th staging of the Cork Senior Hurling Championship since its establishment by the Cork County Board in 1887. The championship began on 2 April 1911 and ended on 10 December 1911.

Blackrock were the defending champions.

On 10 December 1911, Blackrock won the championship following a 3-2 to 0-00 defeat of Aghabullogue in the final. This was their 12th championship title overall and their second title in succession.

Results

First round

Semi-finals

Final

References

Cork Senior Hurling Championship
Cork Senior Hurling Championship